The Central District of Rezvanshahr County is a district (bakhsh) in Rezvanshahr County, Gilan Province, Iran. At the 2006 census, its population was 34,160, in 8,902 families.  The District has one city: Rezvanshahr. The District has two rural districts (dehestan): Gil Dulab Rural District and Khoshabar Rural District.

References 

Rezvanshahr County
Districts of Gilan Province